St. Lewis is a community on the coast of Labrador in the province of Newfoundland and Labrador, Canada. Formerly known as Fox Harbour, St. Lewis is the most easterly permanent community on the North American mainland. The community of St. Lewis enjoys a long and vibrant history as one of the earliest recorded places in all of Labrador by Europeans. Settled in the early 18th century (by Europeans), the area’s sheltered location, proximity to good fishing grounds and seal migration routes made the settlement a desired location for both the European-based migratory fishery, and the native Inuit families who inhabited the south Labrador coast.

Geography
The town lies neatly within a sheltered harbour at the mouth of St. Lewis Bay. Like most of the landscape along the east coast of Labrador, barren, rocky slopes scourged by the frigid Labrador Current extend throughout the St. Lewis Sound. The subarctic climate of the south Labrador coast generally offers a pleasant cool summer climate, which is soon replaced with a snow-covered, ice-chilled winter season. This harsh environment, with a few trifling exceptions, nourishes a hardy boreal ecosystem. Collective forests of black spruce, white spruce and balsam fir are confined to interior valleys and riverbanks where the geography affords mild protection against the elements. Yet, the bleak, rocky shore of the Labrador coastline strongly resembles an Arctic tundra biome.
    
St. Lewis embellishes its position as the easternmost permanent community on the North American mainland. The community’s physical location provides an excellent vantage point to view the southward procession of icebergs and floe-ice commencing every summer. St. Lewis is proudly recognized by Newfoundland and Labrador Tourism as located in the province's renowned "Iceberg Alley".

History
St. Lewis is one of the earliest recorded place names in Labrador. It was depicted on maps as early as 1502-1503 as Ilha de Frey Luis. 

The Loder family from Harbour Grace had established a fish trading business and constructed premises in the community; now restored, it houses exhibits relating the history of St. Lewis. The community has been a radar site since 1957, when the United States constructed Fox Harbour Air Station, a radar site as part of the Pinetree Radar System. A Loran C station was operated by the Canadian Coast Guard at St. Lewis. In January 2010, it was announced that the Loran C signal would be terminated. The broadcasting of the Loran C signal ceased in August 2010.

In 2012, the local fish plant closed.

Demographics 

See also
 List of municipalities in Newfoundland and Labrador
 NunatuKavut
 St. Lewis (Fox Harbour) Airport

References

Inuit in Newfoundland and Labrador
Populated coastal places in Canada
Towns in Newfoundland and Labrador
Populated places in Labrador